Mea is a genus of moths belonging to the family Tineidae.

Species
Mea bipunctella Dietz, 1905
Mea incudella Forbes, 1931
Mea skinnerella Dietz, 1905
Mea yunquella Forbes, 1931

References

Meessiinae